Gürkavak is a village in the Yüksekova District of Hakkâri Province in Turkey. The village is populated by Kurds of the Doski tribe and had a population of 297 in 2022.

The hamlet of İkizler is attached to it.

Population 
Population history of the village from 2000 to 2022:

References 

Villages in Yüksekova District
Kurdish settlements in Hakkâri Province